The 2001–02 Superliga Femenina season was the 14th edition of the top category of the Spanish women's football championship, and the first one under such name. Marking the reunification of the league six years after the dissolution of the old División de Honor, it was contested by eleven teams and it ran from 23 September 2001 to 5 May 2002.

Defending champion Levante won its third title with a 6 points advantage over CF Puebla. RCD Espanyol and CE Sabadell followed in the table at 14 and 15 points from the second position. There were no relegations following the end of the season.

Teams and locations

League table

Results

See also
 2002 Copa de la Reina de Fútbol

References

Season on soccerway

2001-02
Spa
1
women